is a railway station in Shimizu-ku, Shizuoka City, Shizuoka Prefecture, Japan, operated by Central Japan Railway Company (JR Tōkai).

Lines
Shimizu Station is served by the Tōkaidō Main Line, and is located 169.0 kilometers from the starting point of the line at Tokyo Station.

Station layout
The station has a single island platform serving Track 1 and Track 2, connected to the station building by a footbridge. The station building has automated ticket machines, TOICA automated turnstiles and a staffed ticket office.

Platforms

Adjacent stations

|-
!colspan=5|Central Japan Railway Company

{{j-rserv|previous=|next=|service=Home Liner|col=red|}}

 Station history
It was named after Ejiri-juku, the 18th station of the historical Tōkaidō. In 1934 it was renamed Shimizu Station.

From 1916 the Shimizukō Line ran as a branch line from Shimizu Station through the industrial port area of the town before terminating in Miho. In 1984 this line was replaced by a bus service. Regularly scheduled freight services were discontinued in 1984, and all freight services by 2001. Transfer to the Shizuoka-Shimizu Railway is available via Shin-Shimizu Station, a ten-minute walk from the east exit. The current station building was completed in June 2003.

Station numbering was introduced to the section of the Tōkaidō Line operated JR Central in March 2018; Shimizu Station was assigned station number CA14.

Passenger statistics
In fiscal 2017, the station was used by an average of 10,652 passengers daily (boarding passengers only).

Surrounding area
Shimizu Fishing Port 
former Shimizu City Hall

See also
 List of Railway Stations in Japan

References

Yoshikawa, Fumio. Tokaido-sen 130-nen no ayumi''. Grand-Prix Publishing (2002) .

External links

Official home page

Railway stations in Japan opened in 1889
Tōkaidō Main Line
Stations of Central Japan Railway Company
Railway stations in Shizuoka (city)